was the main sea-going component of the Imperial Japanese Navy.

Rengō Kantai may also refer to:

 Imperial Navy (film), Japanese title Rengō Kantai, a 1981 Japanese film about Isoroku Yamamoto

See also
Rengō Kantai Shirei Chōkan: Yamamoto Isoroku, a 1968 film about Isoroku Yamamoto
Rengō Kantai Shirei Chōkan: Yamamoto Isoroku (2011 film), a Japanese film about Isoroku Yamamoto